Assaku is a small borough in Rae Parish, Harju County, northern Estonia. As of 2011 Census, the settlement's population was 460.

References

External links
 Rae Parish 

Boroughs and small boroughs in Estonia